Chipping Campden, or for most of its existence simply Campden, is a closed railway station on the Cotswold Line, which served the town of Chipping Campden in Gloucestershire, England.

The Oxford, Worcester and Wolverhampton Railway was opened in stages. It was later renamed Campden, and in February 1952 became Chipping Campden. It closed on 3 January 1966.

Reopening proposals
There are proposals for a new station at Chipping Campden.

Notes

References
 

Disused railway stations in Gloucestershire
Former Great Western Railway stations
Railway stations in Great Britain opened in 1853
Railway stations in Great Britain closed in 1966
Beeching closures in England
1853 establishments in England
1966 disestablishments in England
Chipping Campden